was a career officer and Lieutenant General in the Imperial Japanese Army who was the most senior Japanese officer killed in combat during the Second Sino-Japanese War.

Biography
Abe was born in Nanawa Village, Kitatsugaru District, Aomori (present day city of Goshogawara, Aomori). He graduated from the Imperial Japanese Army Academy on May 31, 1907, and served in the IJA 32nd Infantry Regiment, the IJA 8th Division and on the staff of the IJA 18th Division. From April 11, 1932, to August 1, 1935, he was commandant of the Sendai Army Training School. He commanded the IA 32nd Infantry Regiment from August 1, 1935, to August 2, 1937, and was commander of the IJA 1st Infantry Brigade from August 2, 1937, to June 1, 1938. On June 1, 1938, he became commander of the 2nd Independent Mixed Brigade which was attached to the Mongolia Garrison Army.

On October 26, 1939, he led 1500 men of the 2nd and 4th Regiments of the 2nd Independent Mixed Brigade out of its garrison at Kalgan south for an operation against the Chinese 120th Division of the Eighth Route Army under General He Long in Hebei Province. However, operations were quickly bogged down by the guerrilla warfare tactics employed by the Chinese, who made good use of the rugged terrain of the Taihang Mountains and were able to encircle the Japanese forces. In the afternoon of November 7, his camp headquarters was attacked by a mortar fired by Chinese guerrillas and Abe was severely wounded in the legs and abdomen. Refusing to order a withdrawal, he died later that night of his injuries. Following Abe's death, Japanese reinforcement rescued the remainder of his command and forced the Eighth Route Army to retreat. Mao Tse-tung issued a telegram praising the 18-year old soldier, Le Erxi, who fired the mortar, and proclaimed him to be a hero of the ant-Japanese resistance. The mortar itself is listed as a national first-class cultural property and is displayed at the Military Museum of the Chinese People's Revolution in Beijing.

Abe was posthumously awarded the Grand Cordon of the Order of the Rising Sun. His grave is at the Tama Cemetery in Tokyo.

Military career

Promotions

References

External links
 Generals.dk
 Forum.valka.cz
 45160u.sakura.ne.jp

1887 births
1939 deaths
Japanese generals
Military personnel killed in the Second Sino-Japanese War
Deaths by explosive device
Grand Cordons of the Order of the Rising Sun
Recipients of the Order of the Sacred Treasure, 3rd class
Recipients of the Order of the Golden Kite
Military personnel from Aomori Prefecture
People from Aomori Prefecture
People from Goshogawara
Imperial Japanese Army generals of World War II